Dod is the surname of:

 Albert Baldwin Dod (1805–1845), American Presbyterian theologian and professor of mathematics
 Charles Dod Irish journalist and writer, known for his reference works, including Dod's Parliamentary Companion
 Daniel Dod (1788–1823), American mathematician and mechanical engineer who fabricated the engine for the first steamboat to cross the Atlantic Ocean
 Donald Dungan Dod (1912–2008), American missionary and orchidologist
 John Dod (c.1549–1645), non-conforming English clergyman
 Lottie Dod (1871–1960), English sportswoman, youngest winner of Wimbledon Ladies' Singles Championship
 Pierce Dod (1683–1754), British physician
 Thaddeus Dod (1740–1793), Presbyterian preacher and educator
 William Dod (1867–1954), British Olympic archer

See also
 Dodd (surname)
 Dodds (surname)
 Dods (disambiguation), including people with the surname